Tevita Takayawa (born 18 May 1996) is a Fijian judoka.

From a family with a strong tradition in Judo, his father Viliame Takayawa represented Fiji at the Olympic Games in 1984 and 1988, and his older brother Nacanieli Takayawa-Qerawaqa also competed in judo at the Olympic Games in 1992, 1996, and 2000 and won a Commonwealth Games gold medal in 2002. His niece, and Nacianieli’s daughter, Shanice Takawaya also competes in Judo. After being selected to compete at the 2020 Summer Games Tevita Takayawa was drawn against Aleksandar Kukolj in the opening round.

References

External links
 
 

1996 births
Living people
Fijian male judoka
Olympic judoka of Fiji
Judoka at the 2020 Summer Olympics
Ryutsu Keizai University alumni
20th-century Fijian people
21st-century Fijian people